Shorewood is a city nestled in the woods along on the shores of Lake Minnetonka in Hennepin County, Minnesota, United States. The population was 7,307 at the 2010 census. The city was incorporated in 1956. Its area was originally part of the former Excelsior Township.

State Highway 7 serves as a main route.

Geography
It includes the Lake Minnetonka islands of Spray, Shady, and part of Enchanted. These islands are more accessible from the nearby city of Mound that provides them with postal services, fire protection, and schools.

Demographics

2010 census
As of the census of 2010, there were 7,307 people, 2,658 households, and 2,131 families living in the city. The racial makeup of the city was 95.8% White, 0.8% African American, 0.3% Native American, 1.4% Asian, 0.1% Pacific Islander, 0.3% from other races, and 1.4% from two or more races. Hispanic or Latino of any race were 1.7% of the population.

There were 2,658 households, of which 38.1% had children under the age of 18 living with them, 71.1% were married couples living together, 6.3% had a female householder with no husband present, 2.7% had a male householder with no wife present, and 19.8% were non-families. 16.5% of all households were made up of individuals, and 7.2% had someone living alone who was 65 years of age or older. The average household size was 2.75 and the average family size was 3.10.

The median age in the city was 45.3 years. 27.1% of residents were under the age of 18; 5.6% were between the ages of 18 and 24; 16.7% were from 25 to 44; 38.1% were from 45 to 64; and 12.5% were 65 years of age or older. The gender makeup of the city was 49.5% male and 50.5% female.

2000 census
As of the census of 2000, there were 7,400 people, 2,529 households, and 2,106 families living in the city. The racial makeup of the city was 97.82% White, 0.39% African American, 0.03% Native American, or Indian, 0.89% Asian, 0.19% from other races, and 0.68% from two or more races. Hispanic or Latino of any race were 0.82% of the population.

There were 2,529 households, out of which 45.3% had children under the age of 18 living with them, 75.7% were married couples living together, 4.9% had a female householder with no husband present, and 16.7% were non-families. 13.2% of all households were made up of individuals, and 3.9% had someone living alone who was 65 years of age or older.  The average household size was 2.93 and the average family size was 3.22.

In the city, the population was spread out, with 31.6% under the age of 18, 4.5% from 18 to 24, 28.3% from 25 to 44, 27.6% from 45 to 64, and 7.9% who were 65 years of age or older.  The median age was 39 years. For every 100 females, there were 100.2 males.  For every 100 females age 18 and over, there were 100.6 males.

The median income for a household in the city was $96,589, and the median income for a family was $104,100. Males had a median income of $68,182 versus $41,679 for females. The per capita income for the city was $44,425.  About 1.3% of families and 1.7% of the population were below the poverty line, including 1.0% of those under age 18 and 3.0% of those age 65 or over.

Politics

Education
The city of Shorewood is part of the Minnetonka Public School District.  Minnewashta Elementary School is located within the city limits and is the largest elementary school in the Minnetonka District.

References

External links
 City of Shorewood

Cities in Hennepin County, Minnesota
Cities in Minnesota
Populated places established in 1956